Antioch Middle School may refer to:
 Antioch Middle School in Antioch, California
 Antioch Upper Grade (Middle) School in Antioch, Illinois
 Antioch Middle School in Gladstone, Missouri, a suburb of Kansas City
 Antioch Middle School in Antioch, Tennessee